The 1989 Copper Bowl featured the NC State Wolfpack and the Arizona Wildcats.

Arizona scored first on a 37-yard touchdown pass from Ronald Veal to Olatide Ogundiditimi giving Arizona a 7–0 lead throughout the 1st quarter. In the second quarter, with NC State driving, Shane Montgomery's pass was intercepted by Scott Geyer and returned 85 yards for a touchdown, making it 14–0 Arizona. Montgomery later found Todd Varn in the end zone for a 4-yard touchdown pass cutting the lead to 14–7. Arizona took a 17–7 halftime lead on a 34-yard Gary Coston field goal. In the third quarter, a 43-yard Hartman field goal made the final score 17–10.

Statistics

Source:

References

Copper Bowl
Guaranteed Rate Bowl
NC State Wolfpack football bowl games
Arizona Wildcats football bowl games
Copper Bowl
December 1989 sports events in the United States
Sports in Tucson, Arizona
Events in Tucson, Arizona